The E. William Brackett House, located in Yakima, Washington, was listed in the National Register of Historic Places in 1990.

Historical background
The home was built in 1917 for E. William Brackett, a prominent local citizen who was a pioneer of irrigation in the Yakima valley. Born in Sharon, Massachusetts, in 1869, he travelled to Washington State with his widowed father in 1890. He served as the founding President of the Natchez-Cowyche Ditch Company (precursor to today's Naches-Cowiche Canal Company) for three years from 1894 until 1897. He travelled to Egypt in the 1920s and returned with drawings of that nation's irrigation system that he shared with the Teiton-Naches project. Brackett was also involved in the civic development of Yakima, founding the Nob Hill Grange and eventually donating  to the City of Yakima for the creation of Franklin Park. Brackett remained in the home until his death in 1950; his wife lived there until her death in 1972.

Architect
W.H.H. Weatherwax was a prominent local architect best known for the design of the Yakima Armory. He listed the Brackett house as among his most important residential works.

Gallery

References

National Register of Historic Places in Yakima County, Washington